The Canton of Val d'Oingt (before March 2020: canton of Le Bois-d'Oingt) is a French administrative division, located in the Rhône department.

The canton was established in 1790 and modified by decree of 27 February 2014 which came into force in March 2015. The canton was expanded from 18 to 27 communes (5 of which were merged into the new communes Porte des Pierres Dorées and Val d'Oingt).

Composition
The canton of Val d'Oingt is composed of 23 communes:

See also
 Cantons of the Rhône department
 Communes of the Rhône department

References

Valdoingt
1790 establishments in France